Fred(erick) Schneider may refer to:

Fred Schneider, singer
Fred B. Schneider, computer scientist
Frederick Schneider (writer), writer on Seven Mile, Ohio
Freddy Schneider, actor in Bellisima
Fred Schneider (Detective Comics 500), fictional character

See also
Frederick Schneider House
Friedrich Schneider, composer